Jefferson Lopes Faustino, commonly known as Jefferson (born 31 August 1988 in Rio de Janeiro) is a Brazilian footballer who plays as a centre back. He played for several seasons in the Bolivian Primera División for Universitario de Sucre, The Strongest and Sport Boys Warnes, with whom he won the 2015 Apertura.

References 

1988 births
Living people
Brazilian footballers
Association football central defenders
Universitario de Sucre footballers
Roasso Kumamoto players
The Strongest players
Sport Boys Warnes players
Audax Rio de Janeiro Esporte Clube players
Bolivian Primera División players
Brazilian expatriate footballers
Expatriate footballers in Japan
Expatriate footballers in Bolivia
Footballers from Rio de Janeiro (city)